Harry Edward Hull (March 12, 1864 – January 16, 1938) was an American businessman and politician who served five terms as a Republican U.S. Representative from Iowa's 2nd congressional district from 1915 to 1925. He also served as Commissioner General of Immigration in the  Coolidge and  Hoover administrations.

Biography 
Born near Belvidere, New York, Hull moved with his parents to Cedar Rapids, Iowa, in 1873.
He attended the grammar and high schools.
He was employed as a clerk and bookkeeper for a grain company.
He moved to Palo, Iowa, in 1883, and to Williamsburg, Iowa, in 1884 and engaged in the grain business.
He also engaged in the manufacture of brick and tile.

He was president of the Williamsburg Telephone Co..
He served as one of Williamsburg's aldermen from 1887 to 1889, as its mayor from 1889 to 1901, and as its postmaster from 1901 to 1914. He also served as president of the Williamsburg Fair Association from 1900 to 1915.

He also had a son, Harris B. Hull, who was a high-ranking American military officer.

Congress 
In 1914, Hull was elected as a Republican to represent Iowa's 2nd congressional district in the U.S. House, defeating Democrat W.J. McDonald.  He served in the Sixty-fourth Congress and in the four succeeding Congresses.  He was one of only fifty representatives who voted against the resolution authorizing the United States' entry into World War I, and one of the few of those fifty to stave off challengers in the wartime primary and general elections in 1918.

In May 1917, during Hull's second term, his wife, Mary Louise Harris Hull, died when she mistook poison tablets for a headache remedy.

In 1924, Hull opposed Henry Ford's proposal to operate fertilizer plants and a hydroelectric dam on the Tennessee River near Muscle Shoals, Alabama. Hull argued against the project over concerns about private business interests controlling important public resources. Ford later cancelled his plans for the project.

When seeking renomination in 1924, he was defeated in the Republican primary by Judge F. Dickinson Letts. In all, he served from March 4, 1915, to March 3, 1925.

Federal agency position 
On May 15, 1925, he was appointed by President Calvin Coolidge as commissioner general of immigration and served in that position until 1933, when he retired.

Retirement and death 
He continued to reside in Washington, D.C., until his death there on January 16, 1938. He was interred in Oak Hill Cemetery in Williamsburg.

References

1864 births
1938 deaths
Republican Party members of the United States House of Representatives from Iowa
Iowa city council members
People from Allegany County, New York
Politicians from Cedar Rapids, Iowa
People from Williamsburg, Iowa
Iowa postmasters
Burials in Iowa
Mayors of places in Iowa